Lt-Col Henry Fishwick  (9 March 1835 – 23 September 1914) was a British soldier, politician and antiquary. After a military career, he became a Liberal Party Councillor (1871–1914) and twice Mayor of Rochdale (1903–05). He was also author and editor of several books on Lancashire and was a founding member of three of the county's historical societies.

Background 
Fishwick was the son of Henry Halliwell Fishwick of Brownhill, Rochdale, and was born on 9 March 1835. At the age of eighteen, he became the secretary of the Rochdale branch of the Young Men's Christian Association.

Soldier 
Fishwick was one of the earliest supporters of the Volunteer Force movement in Rochdale and, when a corps was formed, he joined as a Lieutenant (1860). He was later promoted to Major, and then commanding officer. From 1871, as lieutenant colonel, he was attached to the Eighth (King's) Regiment (stationed in Salford).

Politician 
Fishwick entered local politics in 1871, when he was elected to Rochdale Town Council. He served as a Liberal Party Councillor (1871–1914), and was Chairman of the Library and Art Gallery Committee (from 1881). He was a Member of the School Board (1870–1903), serving as chairman (from 1897), and then a Member of its successor, the Education Committee (1903–14), serving as chairman. In 1909, he was elected President of the Association of Education Committees of England and Wales.

He was twice elected Mayor of Rochdale (in 1903–04 and 1904–05), also serving as a borough magistrate and county JP for Lancashire, and was a prominent Freemason. In 1906, he was honoured with the Honorary Freedom of the borough, and was known as the ‘Father of the Council’. In 1911, Fishwick was honoured by a Public testimonial presented by Lord Sheffield.

Antiquary 
Fishwick was a frequent contributor of papers on various subjects to Transactions of Rochdale Literary and Scientific Society (1880–6) and Transactions of Lancashire and Cheshire Antiquarian Society  (1884–1910). He edited several volumes for the Chetham Society and Record Society of Lancashire and Cheshire, and was the author of several parish histories: Goosnargh (1871), Kirkham (1874), Garstang (1878–79), Rochdale (1889), as well as other works.

Fishwick was a member of several societies: Manchester Arts Club (Founding Member and chairman); Chetham Society (Council Member, 1875–1901, and Vice-President, 1901–14); Rochdale Literary and Scientific Society (Founder Member (1878), President and Vice-President); Record Society of Lancashire and Cheshire (Founder Member, Vice-President, 1878–95, 1904–14, and President, 1895–1904); Historic Society of Lancashire and Cheshire (Council Member, 1880–1914); Lancashire and Cheshire Antiquarian Society (founding member, Council Member, 1883–1914, Vice-President, and President, 1897–98); and Lancashire Parish Register Society (founding member and President, 1897–1914). He was elected a Fellow of the Society of Antiquaries and the Royal Historical Society.

Family 
Fishwick married the daughter of Dr W. H. Bullmore of Truro, Cornwall, and they had four children: one son (who emigrated to Canada) and three daughters, including Janet Fishwick (d.1944). Fishwick lived at The Heights, Rochdale until his death on 23 September 1914.

Select bibliography 
 The History of the parochial Chapelry of Goosnargh in the County of Lancaster. C. Simms, Goosnargh, 1871.
 The History of the Parish of Kirkham in the County of Lancaster. Chetham Society, Old Series, 92 (1874).
 Lancashire and Cheshire Church Surveys 1649–1655. Record Society of Lancashire and Cheshire, 1 (1878).
 History of the Parish of Garstang in the County of Lancaster. Chetham Society, Old Series, Part I: 104 (1878); Part II: 105 (1879).
 A list of Lancashire wills proved in the Archdeaconry of Richmond 1547 to 1680. Record Society of Lancashire and Cheshire,10 (1884).
 The History of the Parish of Poulton-le-Fylde, in the County of Lancaster, Chetham Society, New Series, 8 (1885).
 A list of Lancashire wills proved in the Archdeaconry of Richmond 1681 to 1748. Record Society of Lancashire and Cheshire,13 (1886).
 The History of the Parish of Bispham, in the County of Lancaster. Chetham Society, New Series, 10 (1887).
 The History of the Parish of St Michael-on-Wyre in the County of Lancaster. Chetham Society, New Series, 25 (1891).
 The Note Book of The Rev. Thomas Jolly, A.D. 1671–93. Chetham Society, New Series, 33 (1894).
 Pleadings and depositions in the duchy court of Lancaster. Record Society of Lancashire and Cheshire, Part 1: ' Henry VII and Henry VIII, 32 (1896); Part 2: Henry VIII, 35 (1897); Part 3: Edward VI and Philip & Mary, 40 (1899).
 The History of the Parish of Lytham in the County of Lancaster. Chetham Society, New Series, 60 (1907).
 The Survey of the Manor of Rochdale in the County of Lancaster, Parcel of the Possessions of The Rt Worshipful Sir Robert Heath, Knt, His Majesty’s Attorney-General, made in 1626. Chetham Society, New Series, 71 (1913).

References 

1835 births
1914 deaths
People from Rochdale
Volunteer Force officers
King's Regiment (Liverpool) officers
Freemasons of the United Grand Lodge of England
Mayors of Rochdale
19th-century English writers
19th-century English historians
20th-century English historians
Victorian writers
English antiquarians
Antiquarians
History of Lancashire
Fellows of the Society of Antiquaries of London
Record Society of Lancashire and Cheshire
Lancashire and Cheshire Antiquarian Society
Chetham Society
Historic Society of Lancashire and Cheshire
Lancashire Parish Register Society